The Bodyguard from Beijing (released in the United States as The Defender and United Kingdom as Jet Li's The Defender) is a 1994 Hong Kong action film directed by Corey Yuen, and starring Jet Li, who also produced. The film co-stars Christy Chung, Kent Cheng and Sing Ngai. The film was released theatrically in Hong Kong on 28 July 1994.

Plot
The film protagonizes Allan, a professional bodyguard based in Beijing whose tactical and martial skills and quick thinking are well shown as having protected several statesmen from assassination. He is hired by James, a wealthy Hong Kong businessman, to protect his beautiful girlfriend Michelle Leung, who is the only surviving witness to a murder, after all the others had been eliminated in various ways. Allan arrives at the girl's home in Hong Kong to meet with two somewhat incompetent plainclothes police officers - Fat Po and Ken - in charge of her safety. Soon after meeting Miss Leung, he proves the entire contingent of current bodyguards incapable in his fight with them during what he thought was an assassination attempt, and they are all fired. He also disarms both policemen.

The bodyguard inspects the entire home and vehicles for bugs, bombs and layout, and installs security cameras covering various areas, including Michelle's bedroom, which he can monitor through a personal device. She is unhappy about this and, after attempting unsuccessfully to order him out, manages to knock down the camera with a frying pan. He also gives her a panic button.

During a road trip, hitmen attempt to assassinate her but fail due to Allan's strategy of having a decoy VIP car driven by Fat Po and the girl riding with him in the trailing van.

Michelle tries getting away from her bodyguard by complaining to her boyfriend and by sneaking away during the night with the younger officer, Ken, in a car. Allan reassures James and nonchalantly makes himself visible in the car's headlights as the escapees start it; Michelle has a fit as she goes back into the house.

Michelle eventually goes to the shopping mall accompanied only by the two cops. The mall, however, is staked out by operatives. One is about to murder her by firing his suppressed weapon through a stall partition, but is shot first by Allan, who had followed them and was in the stall beyond hers. This initiates a gunfight through the mall; Allan takes out multiple hitmen while shielding the girl. Eventually he realizes all the hitmen have two pens in their front pocket as identification, and poses as one to take more out. During their escape Fat Po is wounded.

One of the assassins who posed as a police officer and killed by Allan during the shoot-out is the younger brother of Killer Wong, a former Chinese soldier who fought together with his brother. Wong swears vengeance on Allan.

In the meantime, Michelle shows her attraction, which understandably had been growing since the beginning, to Allan after using her transmitter to make him storm the bedroom and "protect" her. He leaves to continue his duties, leaving her panting behind the door.

Things come to a climax when the transmitter sounds again, this time in earnest. Wong and a group of assassins storm the penthouse and start a gunfight. Both policemen and Allan rush to protect her; Ken, the younger cop, was killed by Wong himself. Allan uses his firearm and martial skills and, after darkening the room, cunningly takes out all the assailants until only Wong is left. He and Wong have a long fight, complicated by leaking gas which threatens to black both out. Eventually Wong recovers a pistol and takes the girl hostage. James arrives unawares, and attempts to dissuade Wong from shooting by offering to pay Wong, but Wong refuses. When an opportunity arrises as the assassin backs away, Allan shields Michelle with his body and takes two shots but manages to pull out a bayonet, with which he had been previously wounded, from his chest and throw it towards Wong's neck, killing him.

Before the film ends, James drives Michelle to the border between Hong Kong and mainland China as she tries to see Allan a final time before he heads back to China but guards at the checkpoint deny them entry into the mainland. However, Allan leaves Michelle with the box that held the watch she had given to him as a present and he had tried to refuse. However, when she opens it, the box contains his own watch, while Fat Po receives Allan's payment money to fund his son's school tuition. Michelle cries out Allan's name just as his car drives away from the border back into the mainland.

Cast
 Jet Li as Allan Hui Ching-yeung 
 Christy Chung as Michelle Yeung
 Kent Cheng as Charlie Leung Kam-po ("Fat Po") 
 Sing Ngai as Killer Wong 
 Joey Leung as Keung 
 Ng Wai-kwok as James Song Sai-cheung
 William Chu as Billy
 Wong Kam-kong as Chiu Kwok-man (uncredited)
 Wong Wah-woh as Coroner (uncredited)
 Corey Yuen as Shopper in Mall (uncredited)
 Sam Wong
 Gary Mak as Assassin in Shopping Center
 Kevan Cummins as bodyguard to US President

Production
Shooting took place in Hong Kong.

Release
The film was banned in China after production was finished.  However, Jet Li spoke against the censorship of his films.

Home media 
DVD was released in Region 1 in the United States on August 15, 2000, and Region 2 in the United Kingdom on 29 April 2002, it was distributed by Dimension Home Video.

Television 
In the United Kingdom, the film (released as Jet Li's The Defender) was watched by  viewers on television in 2004, making it the year's fourth most-watched foreign-language film on television (below Crouching Tiger, Hidden Dragon, First Strike, and Fong Sai-yuk II). It was later watched by 600,000 UK viewers in 2006, making it the year's most-watched foreign-language film on BBC1. Combined, the film drew a  UK viewership in 2004 and 2006.

Reception
At the Hong Kong box office, the film grossed HK$11,193,177.

Rotten Tomatoes, a review aggregator, reports that 71% of seven surveyed critics gave the film a positive review; the average rating is 5.5/10.  Joey O'Byan of The Austin Chronicle rated it 2.5/5 stars and called it "lively, unpretentious fun".  Aaron Beierle of DVD Talk rated it 2/5 stars and wrote, "An ok movie; sort of entertaining at times, but not great."

See also
 Jet Li filmography
 List of Hong Kong films

References

External links
 

1994 films
1994 action thriller films
1994 martial arts films
1990s Cantonese-language films
Films about bodyguards
Films directed by Corey Yuen
Films set in Hong Kong
Gun fu films
Hong Kong films about revenge
Hong Kong action thriller films
Hong Kong martial arts films
Kung fu films
Triad films
1990s Hong Kong films